Hulsea brevifolia is a species of flowering plant in the family Asteraceae known by the common name shortleaf alpinegold, or shortleaf hulsea. It is endemic to California, where it is an uncommon resident of the High Sierra.

Description
Hulsea brevifolia is a perennial herb producing loose tufts of erect stems 30 to 60 centimeters (1–2 feet) tall. The green stems and foliage are covered in glandular hairs. The faintly toothed leaves occur basally and also along the stems. They are 5 to 6 millimeters (0.20-0.24 inches) long and have petioles with stiff hairs along the edges.

The daisylike flower heads are up to 2 centimeters (0.8 inches) wide and have long, hairy, lance-shaped green phyllaries. The center of the head is filled thickly with long yellow disc florets and the circumference is lined with 10–23 yellow ray florets.

The fruit is an achene 6 to 8 centimeters (2.4-3.2 inches) long bearing a pappus which may be red-tinged.

References

External links
Jepson Manual Treatment, University of California — Hulsea brevifolia
United States Department of Agriculture Plants Profile
Hulsea brevifolia — Calphotos Photo gallery, University of California
Photo of herbarium specimen at Missouri Botanical Garden, collected in 1866

brevifolia
Endemic flora of California
Flora of the Sierra Nevada (United States)
Plants described in 1868
Flora without expected TNC conservation status